Trichonium or Trichonion was a town of ancient Aetolia, from which Lake Trichonis derived its name. William Martin Leake identified its location in the 19th century south of the lake at a place called Gavala (Gavalou). Strabo mentions Trichonium along with Stratus as situated in a fertile plain. It was evidently a place of importance, and several natives of this town are mentioned in history.

Its site is located near the modern Gavalou.

People
Alexander of Trichonium
Ariston (strategos)

References

Populated places in ancient Aetolia
Former populated places in Greece